Biržai District Municipality is a Lithuanian municipality, located in northern Lithuania, Aukštaitija ethnographic region, Panevėžys County.

The towns of Biržai and Vabalninkas lie within the district. About 64% of its land is agricultural, including a number of organic farms. Portions are protected in Biržai Regional Park and as botanical and geological reserves.

Elderships
Biržai District Municipality is divided into 8 elderships:

Landmarks
 Sinkholes around Biržai, including Karvės ola (Cow's Hole)
 Biržai Castle
 Lithuania's northernmost point

Structure 
District structure:   
 2 cities – Biržai and Vabalninkas;
 4 towns – Kupreliškis, Nemunėlio Radviliškis, Pabiržė and Papilys;
 538 villages.
  
Biggest population (2001): 
Biržai – 15262
Vabalninkas – 1328
Biržai village – 874
Nemunėlio Radviliškis – 729
Medeikiai – 656
Kirdonys – 492
Naciūnai – 455
Germaniškis – 429
Parovėja – 402

References

 
Municipalities of Panevėžys County
Municipalities of Lithuania